The score from The Empire Strikes Back composed by John Williams. Between Star Wars and The Empire Strikes Back, Williams had also worked with the London Symphony Orchestra for the scores to the films The Fury, Superman and Dracula. The score earned another Academy Award nomination for Williams. Again, the score was orchestrated by Herbert W. Spencer and Angela Morley, recorded by engineer Eric Tomlinson and edited by Kenneth Wannberg with supervision by Lionel Newman. John Williams himself took over duties as record producer from Star Wars creator George Lucas.

The soundtrack was first released in the United States as a 75-minute double LP five days before the film's premiere but the first Compact Disc release ran only half the length of the 2-LP set. Re-recordings of the score even included music that was not on the original CD soundtrack. A remastered version of the soundtrack was released by Walt Disney Records on May 4, 2018.

Background
The musical score of The Empire Strikes Back was composed and conducted by John Williams, and performed by the London Symphony Orchestra at a cost of about $250,000. Williams began planning in November 1979, estimating Empire required 107 minutes of score. For two weeks across 18 three-hour sessions just after Christmas, Williams recorded the score at Anvil Studios and EMI Studios, London. Up to 104 players were involved at any one time, performing with instruments including oboes, piccolos, pianos, and harps.

History

In 1980, the disco label RSO Records released the film's original soundtrack in a double-album, with two long-playing (LP) records. Combined, the two records featured seventy-five minutes of film music. This double LP package also included a booklet presentation with pictures of the main characters and action sequences from the film. Featured at the booklet's end was an interview with John Williams about the music and the new themes, such as "The Imperial March (Darth Vader's Theme)" and "Yoda's Theme". It also included a brief explanation of each track. The front cover artwork featured Darth Vader's mask against the backdrop of outer space; and the back cover featured the famous Gone with the Wind version of the poster art. As a side note, this package marked the final time a double LP soundtrack set was ever issued (Episode VI, the final film to have an LP soundtrack released, had only a single disc, also released by RSO Records). A double-cassette edition was also released.

In the U.K., a single vinyl album and cassette were released in 1980 by RSO Records. This comprised only ten tracks, which were also re-arranged differently. For instance, the first track on the U.K. release is "The Imperial March" instead of the "Star Wars Main Theme". This track listing would be used for the album's first international CD release in 1985. Also unlike the U.S. version, this release did not have a booklet but the information (and some photographs) were replicated on the inner sleeve.

In 1985, the first Compact Disc (CD) release of the soundtrack was issued by Polydor Records, which had by that time absorbed RSO Records and its entire music catalog. As with the album's original U.K. vinyl and cassette release, this CD release reduced the music content from the seventy-five minutes featured in the 1980 U.S. double-album down to forty-two minutes.

In 1993, 20th Century Fox Film Scores released a special four-CD box set: Star Wars Trilogy: The Original Soundtrack Anthology. This anthology included the soundtracks to all three of the original Star Wars films in separate discs. The disc dedicated to The Empire Strikes Back restored almost all of the original seventy-five minutes from the 1980 LP version and included new music cues never released before for a total of nineteen tracks. On the fourth bonus disc, five additional tracks from Empire were included in a compilation of additional cues from the other two films. This CD release also marked the first time that the famous "20th Century Fox Fanfare" composed by Alfred Newman in 1954 was added to the track listing, preceding the "Star Wars Main Theme".

In 1997, RCA Victor released a definitive two-disc set coinciding with the Special Edition releases of the original trilogy's films. This original limited-edition set featured a thirty-two page black booklet that was encased inside a protective outer slipcase. The covers of the booklet and the slipcase had the Star Wars Trilogy Special Edition poster art. This booklet was very detailed, providing extensive notes on each music cue and pictures of the main characters and action sequences from the film. The two discs were placed in sleeves that were on the booklet's inside front and inside back covers. Each disc had a glittery laser-etched holographic logo of the Empire. The musical content featured the complete film score for the first time. It had all of the previously released tracks (restoring the Mynock Cave music which was left off the 1993 release), included extended versions of five of those tracks with previously unreleased material, and six brand new tracks of never before released music for a total of one hundred twenty-four minutes. All the tracks were digitally remastered for superior clarity of sound. They were also re-arranged and re-titled from the previous releases to follow the film's story in chronological order. RCA Victor re-packaged the Special Edition set later in 1997, offering it in slimline jewel case packaging as an unlimited edition, but without the original "black booklet" version's stunning presentation and packaging.

In 2004, Sony Classical acquired the rights to the classic trilogy scores since it already had the rights to release the second trilogy soundtracks (The Phantom Menace and Attack of the Clones). In 2004, Sony Classical re-pressed the 1997 RCA Victor release of the Special Edition Star Wars trilogy, including The Empire Strikes Back. The set was released in a less-than-spectacular package with the new art work mirroring the film's first DVD release. Despite the Sony digital remastering, which minimally improved the sound heard only on high-end stereos, this 2004 release is essentially the 1997 RCA Victor release.

In 2016, Sony Classical released a remastered version of the original 1980 release as a two-disc LP, copying all aspects of the original RSO release, down to the labeling.

On May 4, 2018, Walt Disney Records released a newly-remastered edition of the original 1980 album program on CD, digital download, and streaming services. This remaster was newly assembled from the highest-quality tapes available, rather than sourced from the existing 1980 album masters. This release marks the first release on CD of the complete 1980 soundtrack album.

Release history

Track listing

First U.S. release on LP 
 First release on LP by RSO.

Total Time: 74:34

Charts

Original U.K. release and first international release on CD 
 First release on CD by Polydor.
"The Imperial March (Darth Vader's Theme)" – 3:00
"Yoda's Theme" – 3:27
"The Asteroid Field" – 4:10
"Han Solo and the Princess" – 3:26
"Finale" – 6:25
"Star Wars (Main Theme)" – 5:48
"The Training of a Jedi Knight" – 3:05
"Yoda and the Force" – 4:02
"The Duel" – 4:03
"The Battle in the Snow" – 3:48
  
Total Time: 41:23

Star Wars Trilogy: The Original Soundtrack Anthology 

In 1993, 20th Century Fox Film Scores released a four-CD box set containing music from the original Star Wars trilogy. Disc two in the set was devoted to The Empire Strikes Back, with further tracks on disc four.

Note: Parts of tracks six and seventeen on this particular set have their left & right channels reversed).

The first part of track twenty-one, "Ewok Celebration (Film Version)", is from Return of the Jedi.

Special edition re-issue 
In preparation for the 20th anniversary Special Edition releases of the original trilogy's films, 20th Century Fox spent four months, from April to July 1996, transferring, cleaning and preparing the original soundtracks for special two-disc releases. The original release, by RCA Victor in 1997, consisted of limited-edition books with laser etched CDs inside the front and back covers with each book. In the case of The Empire Strikes Back, the discs are etched with the logo for the Empire. The discs were given an unlimited release in a two-disc jewel case, also by RCA Victor later that year. They were again re-released in 2004 by Sony Music, with new artwork paralleling the original trilogy's first DVD release.

Recording information

Cue List
 1M1 Main Title (2)
 1M2 The Imperial Probe (3)
 1M2 New Start
 1M2 Insert Bar 80
 1M2 Insert #2 Bar 109
 1M3/2M1 Luke's Escape
 2M2 Ben's Instructions
 2M3 Luke's Rescue
 2M4 The Probe Scanner
 3M1 Drawing The Battle Lines
 3M2 Leia's Instructions
 3M3 The Snow Battle
 3M4/4M1 Luke's First Crash
 4M2 The Rebels Escape Again
 4M3 The Asteroid Field
 5M1 Crash Landing
 5M2 Yoda Appears
 5M3 Yoda's Entrance (4)
 5M3 End Fix
 5M4/6M1 Solo And The Princess
 6M2 Yoda's Teaching
 6M3 This Is Not A Cave
 6M4 Training A Jedi
 6M5/7M1 The Magic Tree
 7M2 Attack Position
 7M3 Yoda Raises The Ship
 7M4/8M1 Vader's Command
 8M2 City In The Clouds
 8M3 Lando's Palace
 9M1 Luke To The Rescue
 9M2 Vadar Shows Up
 9M3 Putting ThreePio Together
 9M4 Trouble In Prison
 9M6/10M1 Carbon Freeze (5)
 9M6/10M1 Insert Bar 57
 10M2 Luke Pursues The Captives
 10M3 Chewie Chokes Lando
 11M1 Through The Window
 12M1 Losing A Hand
 12M2 To Hyper-Space
 12M3 Finale (6)
 12M4 End Credits (7)
 12M4 End Credits Insert

See also
 Music of Star Wars
Empire Jazz

References

Works cited
 

Star Wars film soundtracks
John Williams soundtracks
Soundtrack
1980 soundtrack albums
1980s film soundtrack albums
Sony Classical Records soundtracks
London Symphony Orchestra soundtracks
Grammy Award for Best Score Soundtrack for Visual Media
Walt Disney Records soundtracks